David Martin "Dave" Davies is an American print and broadcast journalist based in Texas.

As a newspaper columnist for the San Antonio Express-News, he writes about video games. In the mid-2000s, Davies was the host of a television show U@Play, produced in the San Antonio area, which covered home video games.  The 30-minute show was broadcast in Austin, San Antonio and Laredo, in Texas, and in Monterrey in northeastern Mexico.

Davies is also an award-winning journalist and the host of Texas Matters, a weekly radio news magazine show for Texas Public Radio, and The Source, a daily show called that airs Monday through Thursday.

Since becoming the news director for Texas Public Radio, Davies began using his full name "David Martin Davies" to avoid confusion with another Dave Davies who appears on National Public Radio.

References

External links

 http://www.mySA.com
 http://www.TPR.org

1960s births
Living people
People from Laredo, Texas
Television personalities from Texas